A series of pogroms against Jews in the city of Odessa, Ukraine, then part of the Russian Empire, took place during the 19th and early 20th centuries. They occurred in 1821, 1859, 1871, 1881 and 1905.

According to Jarrod Tanny, most historians in the early 21st century agree that the earlier incidents were a result of "frictions unleashed by modernization," rather than by a resurgence of medieval antisemitism. The 1905 pogrom was markedly larger in scale, and antisemitism played a central role.

Odessa had a multi-ethnic population included Greek, Jewish, Russian, Ukrainian and other communities.

1821 pogrom
The 1821 pogrom, perpetrated by ethnic Greeks rather than Russians, is named in some sources as the first in the modern period in Russia:

In Odessa, Greeks and Jews were two rival ethnic and economic communities, living side by side. The first Odessa pogrom, in 1821, was linked to the outbreak of the Greek War for Independence, during which the Jews were accused of sympathizing with the Ottoman authorities and of aiding the Turks in killing the Greek Patriarch of Constantinople, Gregory V, dragging his dead body through the streets and finally throwing it into the Bosphorus.

1859 pogrom
According to the Jewish Encyclopedia (1906 ed.),

The community did not escape the horrors of the pogrom. Indeed, the very first pogrom in Russia occurred in Odessa in the year 1859. This was in reality not a Russian but a Greek pogrom; for the leaders and almost all of the participants were Greek sailors from ships in the harbor, and local Greeks who joined them. The pogrom occurred on a Christian Easter; and the local press, in no wise unfriendly to the Jews, attempted to transform it into an accidental fight, the Greek colony at that time being dominant in the administration as well as in the commerce of Odessa. Further pogroms occurred in 1871, 1881, and 1886."

Historians note economic antagonism between the two urban minorities, in addition to religious frictions.

1871 pogrom
But, after 1871, the pogroms in Odessa took a form more typical of the rest of the Russian empire: 
"Although the pogrom of 1871 was occasioned in part by a rumor that Jews had vandalized the Greek community's church, many non-Greeks participated to it. Russian resentment and hostility toward Jews came to the fore in the pogrom of 1871 as Russians joined Greeks in attacks on Jews. Thereafter, Russians filled the ranks of pogromist mobs in 1881, 1900, and 1905." In the 1881 and 1905 pogroms, many Greek houses were also destroyed.

The 1871 pogrom is seen as a turning point in Russian Jewish history: "The Odessa pogrom led some Jewish publicists, exemplified by the writer Peretz Smolenskin, to question belief in the possibility of Jewish integration into Christian society, and to call for a greater awareness of Jewish national identity."

1881–1906 period

In the post-1871 period, pogroms were often perpetrated with tacit approval of the Tsarist authorities. Evidence exists that during the 1905 pogrom, the army supported the mob:
The Bolshevik Piatnitsky who was in Odessa at the time recalls what happened: "There I saw the following scene: a gang of young men, between 25 and 20 years old, among whom there were plain-clothes policemen and members of the Okhrana, were rounding up anyone who looked like a Jew—men, women and children—stripping them naked and beating them mercilessly... We immediately organised a group of revolutionaries armed with revolvers... we ran up to them and fired at them. They ran away. But suddenly between us and the pogromists there appeared a solid wall of soldiers, armed to the teeth and facing us. We retreated. The soldiers went away, and the pogromists came out again. This happened a few times. It became clear to us that the pogromists were acting together with the military."

1905 Pogrom

The 1905 Pogrom of Odessa was the worst anti-Jewish pogrom in Odessa's history. Between 18 and 22 October 1905, ethnic Russians, Ukrainians, and Greeks killed over 400 Jews and damaged or destroyed over 1600 Jewish properties.

Background of Jews in Odessa

The city of Odessa, founded in the late 18th century, encouraged foreign immigration, especially for the purpose of promoting economic growth. For this reason, Jews were far more welcome in Odessa than in many other parts of the Pale of Settlement. But the Jews of Odessa were not viewed as equal to Gentile residents and suffered from anti-Semitism. A number of serious anti-Jewish pogroms occurred during the 19th century in Odessa, and rumors of a pogrom arose each year around Eastertime. Jewish and Russian youths also often got into violent fights with each other.

Causes

The combination of economic downturn, Jewish backing of Japan in the war against Russia, Jewish support for the October Manifesto, and the June 1905 massacre, all contributed to great tension between Gentiles and the Jewish community in Odessa in 1905.

Long-term causes

Anti-Semitism among Greeks:

Growing anti-Semitism as a result of the changing place of Jews in Odessa's economy created an environment conducive to a pogrom. When the Crimean War disrupted trade routes, many Greek commercial firms shifted their business out of Odessa due to bankruptcy or a willingness to seek more profitable trading locations. To fill the resulting vacuum in grain trade, Jewish merchants expanded business and began to acquire greater profits. Many factors contributed to the spread of anti-Semitism among Greeks in Odessa including: the success of many Jewish traders, their preferential hiring of Jewish workers, and rumors of hostile actions by Jews toward Greeks.

Anti-Semitism among Russians:

Many Russians blamed the Jews for their troubles, such as limited employment opportunities and lower wages. They cited dramatic Jewish population growth in Odessa, from 14% (14,000 of 100,000) in 1858 to 35% (140,000 of 400,000) in 1897. These numbers contributed to suspicion that Jews possessed great wealth, power, and influence in Odessa. Although by the end of the 19th century, Jews held high positions in manufacturing, the majority of wealth in Odessa belonged to non-Jews. Jews certainly did not dominate the economy of Odessa, nor did they control Odessa politically. Unlike other ethnic and religious groups, wealthy Jews could not transform wealth into political power. Out of the 3449 total staff of the imperial government, only 71 were Jews. After an 1892 civic reform, Jews could no longer elect representatives to city councils; instead, a special office for municipal affairs appointed six Jews to the sixty-person Odessa city council. Given that 35% of Odessa's population in 1897 were Jewish, restricting representation on the city council to 10% of the positions was discriminatory.

Immediate causes

A significant economic downturn in Odessa at the turn of the 20th century played a major part in the October Pogrom of 1905. Restricted trading, reduced industrial production, and the Russo-Japanese War resulted in high unemployment in Odessa. Many workers despised Jews for lay-offs during the economic recession. Hatred for Jews heightened when a number of Jews did not support the war with Japan. Patriotic Russians called Jews unpatriotic and disloyal.

Fear of a pogrom in April 1905 prompted the National Committee of Jewish Self-Defense to urge Jews to arm themselves and protect their property. Non-Jews were threatened with armed retaliation if a pogrom occurred. Although a pogrom did not take place until October, fear of one re-emerged in June when Jews were declared culpable for instigating shootings as well as fires at the port. On 13 June 1905, Cossacks shot several striking workers. The next day, large groups of workers stopped working and attacked police with rocks and guns.  The battleship Potemkin, whose crew had mutinied on 14 June, arrived in Odessa that evening. Thousands of Odesans went to the port to see the battleship and support the mutinous sailors. During the afternoon of 15 June, the unruly crowd began to raid warehouses and set fire to wooden buildings in the harbor. Chaos ensued when, in order to prevent further unrest, the military blocked off the harbor and fired into the crowd. Strikes, disorder, and the arrival of Potemkin resulted in the deaths of more than 1,000 people at the Port of Odessa. A few days after the atrocious incident at the harbor, an anti-Semitic pamphlet called Odesskie dni ("Odesan Days") appeared, blaming the Jews for the tragedy. Odesskie dni demanded compensation by Jews to the non-Jews, disarmament of Jews in Odessa, and a search of all Jewish apartments in the city. Although the events of June did not immediately cause a pogrom, an anti-Semitic environment had been formed, sufficient for the October Pogrom.

On 17 October, Tsar Nicholas II issued the October Manifesto, which established civil liberties for the people and promised to create an elected assembly. It was reported in Odessa on 18 October, causing celebration in the streets. Jews hoped that the Manifesto would lead to greater freedom and less anti-Semitism in the Russian Empire. While many Jews and liberals in Odessa celebrated the October Manifesto, conservatives considered the document as a threat to the autocracy and the might of the Russian Empire.

The October Pogrom

Buildup to pogrom: 14–17 October

On 14 October, a number of high school students skipped classes and attempted, but failed due to police intervention, to join rallies taking place at the university. In the process of intercepting them, armed policeman injured several youths. The next day, radical students and revolutionaries armed themselves and encouraged other workers to lend them support. On 16 October, students and workers took to the streets and erected barricades. To try to preserve order, the police fought them, killing several students. Although a public funeral had been planned for the students, the Odessa city governor, D. M. Neidhart, had the bodies buried secretly to limit rallying around the deaths. On 17 October, the police and military continued to monitor the streets, though no major confrontations occurred. About 4000 workers, including many Jews, went on strike.

Crisis: 18 October

On 18 October, Jews and liberals cheered at the news of the October Manifesto. Although demonstrations began peacefully, they quickly turned violent. Those chanting anti-regime propaganda caused trouble when they took out red flags and anti-imperial propaganda. As violence increased between supporters and opponents of the October Manifesto, members of the latter group began to take out their anger on Odessa's Jews, identifying them as the root of Russia's troubles. When a group of Jews asked a few Russian workers to show respect to a red flag, a fight broke out on the streets and soon turned into an anti-Jewish riot.

Pogrom: 19–21 October

The bulk of the October Pogrom took place on p 19-21 October and was worst on 20 October. Violence spread all over Odessa, from the city center, to the suburbs, and to nearby villages. The rioters demonstrated excellent organization throughout sections of Odessa, coordinating their numbers based on the size of the neighborhood under attack. Rather than working to protect Jews and end the pogrom, many policemen and soldiers wearing civilian clothes watched or participated in the massacre. Though they suffered many casualties and were eventually vanquished, Jewish self-defense forces successfully defended some houses as well as streets and even neighborhoods.

On 21 October, after much of the pogrom was over, the city governor Neidhart, and the commander of the Odessa military garrison, A. V. Kaul'bars, appeared in the streets. They told the rioters to get off the streets and go home. Neidhart and Kaul'bars' inaction up to this point became the subject of debate and led to Neidhart's subsequent resignation from office.

According to a subsequent account written by the British Consul to Odessa, Charles Stewart Smith, Neidhart had ordered the police to withdraw from the streets, allowing the mobs a free hand to murder, rape and pillage. Stewart Smith addressed to M. Neidhart a forceful protest calling upon him to stop the pogrom and re-call the police to their duties. The French Consul-General wrote to the Prefect in the same sense. Next day the pogrom subsided. ‘It is quite clear,’ Stewart Smith reported to the Foreign Office, ‘that the late disorders were prepared and worked by the police who openly superintended the work of destruction, looting and murder.’ A few weeks later he wrote: ‘There were hopes that there would be a real judicial investigation of the whole affair, with proper apportionment of blame; but the Emperor has thanked the troops, and apparently Neidhart has been given another post (Nijni Novgorod). One newspaper says that M. Witte objected, but he was told that it was too late, the appointment was made. I was hoping that a real victory might be won for the law as against lawlessness of high officials, but my hopes are waning.’

Aftermath and Jewish response

Various reports estimate the number of Jews killed in the October Pogrom from 302 to 1,000. Other relevant statistics from the pogrom include approximately 5,000 Jews injured, 3.75 million rubles in property damage, 1,400 ruined businesses, and 3,000 families forced into poverty. The Odessa Jewish Central Committee to Aid the Victims of the Pogroms of 1905 collected 672,833 rubles from Jews in Odessa and abroad to aid those hurt by the pogrom. In total, the committee assisted 2,499 families affected by the October Pogrom. 

Charles Stewart Smith, the British Consul, later wrote that such was the prevailing lawlessness that for many months the streets continued to be unsafe. Armed robberies were everyday occurrences. Six months after the pogrom he wrote in a private letter: ‘Crime continues in odious intensity. The “Black Crow” robberies have subsided, but bombs are thrown and assassinations occur far too often. A surgeon friend tells me that formerly in the Town hospital they used to receive one or two stabbing cases every week; now there are one or two a day.' 

It was one of the events that resulted in many Jews emigrating from Odessa and Ukraine to western Europe and to the United States in the following years.

See also
1941 Odessa massacre
 Odessa Museum of the Regional History

References

External links
 
 "Pogroms, 1871-1906" Center for Online Judaic Studies COJS.org

Anti-Jewish pogroms in the Russian Empire
Jewish Ukrainian history
Jews and Judaism in Odesa
History of Odesa
Massacres in Ukraine
Kherson Governorate
Conflicts in 1821
Conflicts in 1859
Conflicts in 1871
Conflicts in 1881
Conflicts in 1905
Mass murder in 1905 
1821 murders in the Russian Empire 
1859 murders in the Russian Empire 
1871 murders in the Russian Empire 
1881 murders in the Russian Empire 
1905 murders in the Russian Empire